James Conner (September 1, 1829 – June 26, 1883), was a Confederate States Army brigadier-general during the American Civil War. He was a lawyer in South Carolina both before and after the war and was elected Attorney General of South Carolina in 1876.

Early life
James Conner was born on September 1, 1829, in Charleston, South Carolina.  Conner was Presbyterian and remarked that he identified with "Ulster" which was an archaic name for what is today known as Northern Ireland.  Conner was born in Charleston, as were both of his parents, all four of his grandparents were Presbyterians of Scottish descent from Ballymena, Ireland in what is today Northern Ireland. After graduating from that state's College in 1849, he studied law and practiced it in Charleston. In 1856, he was appointed United States district attorney and served in this office until 1860. Conner authored The History of a Suit at Law (1857). He prosecuted the famous case against the slave ship Echo. He also prosecuted a member of William Walker's filibustering effort. Conner was a secessionist and supported the calling of a secessionist convention. Although he was a member of the convention, he did not vote on the ordinance of secession.

American Civil War
James Conner participated in the bombardment of Fort Sumter as a captain of the Montgomery Guards, a South Carolina militia unit. At the beginning of the Civil War, he declined an appointment as a district attorney for the Confederacy. Instead, he became a captain in the Hampton Legion and fought at the Battle of First Bull Run (First Manassas), taking temporary command of the legion after Colonel Wade Hampton was wounded. On July 21, 1861, Conner was appointed major of Hampton's Legion. After the Battle of Seven Pines during the Peninsula Campaign, he took command of the 22nd North Carolina Volunteer Infantry Regiment. During the Seven Days Battles, his leg was broken by a rifle ball during the Battle of Gaines Mill. After a two-month recovery period, he returned to lead his regiment at the Battle of Chancellorsville and the Battle of Gettysburg.

He resigned his command on August 13, 1863, and became a member of the military court of the 2nd Corps, Army of Northern Virginia. Returning to field command in 1864, Conner was promoted to brigadier-general on June 1, 1864. He temporarily commanded the brigades of Brigadier Generals Samuel McGowan and James H. Lane consecutively during the opening months of the Siege of Petersburg. He then led Major-General John B, Kershaw's former brigade during the Shenandoah Valley Campaigns of 1864. Six days before the main battle, Conner was severely wounded during a skirmish at Cedar Creek (Fisher's Hill) and he lost a leg to amputation. This effectively ended his Confederate States Army field service, although his service record shows an assignment to General Joseph E. Johnston's command on February 25, 1865. There is no record of his parole.

Aftermath
After the Civil War, James Conner returned to his law practice in Charleston. A member and Past Master of Landmark Lodge No. 76, A.F.M., he served as Grand Master of Masons in South Carolina from 1868 to 1870. In 1876, he was elected attorney general of South Carolina. In that office, he was able to obtain judicial confirmation of the election of former Confederate Major-General Wade Hampton as governor of the state.

James Conner died in Richmond, Virginia, on June 26, 1883. He is buried in Magnolia Cemetery (Charleston, South Carolina). The Letters of General James Conner, C.S.A. was published posthumously in 1933.

See also
 List of American Civil War generals (Confederate)

Notes

References
 Andrew, Rod. Wade Hampton: Confederate warrior to southern redeemer. Chapel Hill: University of North Carolina Press, 2008. . Retrieved July 26, 2011.
 Eicher, John H., and David J. Eicher. Civil War High Commands. Stanford, CA: Stanford University Press, 2001. .
 Sifakis, Stewart. Who Was Who in the Civil War. New York: Facts On File, 1988. .
 Warner, Ezra J. Generals in Gray: Lives of the Confederate Commanders. Baton Rouge: Louisiana State University Press, 1959. .
 Wert, Jeffrey D. "Conner, James" in Historical Times Illustrated History of the Civil War, edited by Patricia L. Faust. New York: Harper & Row, 1986. . pp. 159–160.

1829 births
1883 deaths
Confederate States Army brigadier generals
People of South Carolina in the American Civil War
South Carolina Attorneys General
19th-century American politicians
Burials at Magnolia Cemetery (Charleston, South Carolina)